The Bakhtiyarpur–Tilaiya line is a railway line connecting Bakhtiyarpur on the Howrah–Delhi main line and  on the Gaya–Kiul line both in the Indian state of Bihar.

History
The line has its origins in Bakhtiyarpur–Bihar Sharif light railway which was a -wide narrow-gauge railway laid by Martin's Light Railways from Bakhtiyarpur to Bihar Sharif in 1903 and extended to Rajgir in 1911. The broad-gauge line was extended from Rajgir to Tilaiya and opened in 2010. The line is to be extended up to Koderma. Feasibility studies for the electrification of the Manpur–Tilaiya–Kiul sector and Fatwa–Islampur–Bakhtiyarpur–Rajgir sectors were announced in the rail budget for 2010–11. Survey work for doubling of this line has been completed and awaiting for green signal from Railway Safety Commissioner.

Electrification
The Bakhtiyarpur–Rajgir section was electrified in 2016–2017, while the Rajgir–Tilaiya section was electrified in 2017. The Tilaiya–Gaya section was electrified along with the Gaya–Kiul line in October 2018.

Workshops
Carriage Repair Workshop, Harnaut has the capacity to repair and refurbish 500 coaches or more annually.

Important stations

Rajgir and Nalanda, on this line, are popular tourist destinations and are part of the Buddhist Circuit of Bihar. Pawapuri is part of the Jain Circuit of Bihar.

Sections
 Bakhtiyarpur–Rajgir section
 Rajgir–Tilaiya–Gaya section
 Daniyawan–Bihar Sharif–Sheikhpura line
 Harnaut–Mokama section

References

External links
Trains at Bakhtiyarpur
Trains at Rajgir
Trains at Tilaiya
  
  
 

|

5 ft 6 in gauge railways in India
Railway lines in Bihar